Dodonaea petiolaris is a shrub species in the genus Dodonaea found in Australia.

Description 
It is an erect shrub, 1–2(–5) m high living on sandy and loamy soils, on rocky hillsides and ridges. The seed possesses a water gap explaining its dormancy.

Chemicals
Dodonaea petiolaris yields the diterpene ent-3β-acetoxy-15,16-epoxylabda-8(17),13(16),14-trien-18-oic acid (C22H28O6) or its enantiomer.

Distribution
The species occurs in Western Australia, South Australia, the Northern Territory, Queensland and New South Wales.

See also
 List of Australian plant species authored by Ferdinand von Mueller
 Flora of New South Wales

References

External links

petiolaris
Flora of New South Wales
Flora of the Northern Territory
Flora of Queensland
Flora of South Australia
Flora of Western Australia
Taxa named by Ferdinand von Mueller